Siah Sang may refer to:
 Siah Sang, Fariman, Razavi Khorasan Province
 Siah Sang, Zaveh, Razavi Khorasan Province
 Siah Sang-e Jadid, Tehran Province